Macedonia is an unincorporated community in Cherokee County, South Carolina, United States.

References

Unincorporated communities in Cherokee County, South Carolina
Unincorporated communities in South Carolina